Fuaim (Irish for "sound") is the sixth album by Irish folk group Clannad. It was released in 1982. It was produced by Nicky Ryan and was the last Clannad album to feature younger sister Eithne Ní Bhraonáin, later known as Enya. It is also the only Clannad album to credit her; while she performed keyboard and backing vocals on the previous album "Crann Úll", she was not credited for this. She departed, along with Nicky Ryan, shortly thereafter to begin a solo career.

The album was remastered and reissued on 7 August 2020 in both compact disc and vinyl formats.

Track listing
"Na Buachaillí Álainn" – 2:57
"Mheall Sí Lena Glórthaí Mé" – 4:17
"Bruach na Carraige Báine" – 2:37
"Lá Breá Fán dTuath" – 0:45
"An tÚll" – 3:07
"Strayed Away" – 2:46
"Ní Lá na Gaoithe Lá na Scoilb?" – 6:11
"Lish Young Buy-A-Broom" – 3:30
"Mhórag 's na Horo Gheallaidh" – 1:43
"The Green Fields of Gaothdobhair" – 4:09
"Buaireadh an Phósta" – 2:52

Singles
 "Mhórag 'S Na Horo Gheallaidh"

Personnel

Band
 Ciarán Ó Braonáin – bass, guitar, keyboards, vocals
 Máire Ní Bhraonáin – vocals, harp
 Pól Ó Braonáin – flute, guitar, percussion, vocals
 Noel Ó Dúgáin – guitar, vocals
 Pádraig Ó Dúgáin – guitar, mandolin, vocals
 Eithne Ní Bhraonáin (Enya) – percussion, keyboards, vocals

Additional musicians
 Neil Buckley – clarinet, saxophones
 Noel Bridgeman – percussion
 Pat O'Farrell – electric guitar

Production
 Brian Masterson – engineer
 Pearce Dunne – assistant engineer
 Clannad – liner notes
 Paul Wexler – liner notes
 Nicky Ryan – producer

Notes

External links
 Album sleevenotes
 Record Label Catalogue 2010
 The Official Clannad Website

1982 albums
Clannad albums